Jungers may refer to:

Eugène Jacques Pierre Louis Jungers (1888–1958), Belgian Governor-General 
 (born 1986), French actor
Jamie Jungers, woman associated with Tiger Woods
John J. Jungers (1864–1947), American politician
William L. Jungers (born 1948), American anthropologist
 Anthony Susan Jungers (born 1982), US Navy Aviation Ordnanceman iYaOyAs!!!

See also 
Jünger
Junger (disambiguation)